Tatyana Petrova Arkhipova (born 8 April 1983 in Urmarsky District, Chuvashia as Tatyana Valeriyevna Petrova) is a Russian runner. She is a former specialist in the 3000 metres steeplechase, and won a bronze medal at the 2008 Beijing Olympics. She later moved up to marathon and won the Olympic bronze medal in that event at the 2012 London Games.

Running career
As a junior, Petrova finished nineteenth at the 2001 European Cross Country Championships and reached the finals of both the 3000 metres and 5000 metres at the 2002 World Junior Championships in Athletics.

Petrova won the 5000 metres silver medal at the 2003 European Athletics U23 Championships, finishing behind Turkish runner Elvan Abeylegesse. She returned to the event in 2005 but was beaten by Binnaz Uslu. She won the gold medal in 10,000 metres at the same meet.

Petrova began competing in road running events and took back-to-back wins at the Monument Avenue 10K from 2004 and 2005. She made her marathon debut in December 2004, coming fifth at the Honolulu Marathon. She was eighth at the 2005 Chicago Marathon and improved her best to 2:31:03.

A switch to focus on the steeplechase event proved highly successful for Petrova, as in her first year she ran a world best indoors for the 3000 m steeplechase and took the silver medal outdoors at the 2006 European Championships, finishing behind Alesia Turava. The following year she took the steeplechase silver at the 2007 World Championships (in a personal best time of 9:09.19 minutes) and came close to a medal at the 2008 Beijing Olympics, taking fourth behind Russian teammates Gulnara Samitova-Galkina and Yekaterina Volkova and Eunice Jepkorir of Kenya who took silver.

Her focus switched back to marathon running in 2009, as she ran a personal best of 2:25:53 for fourth at the Dubai Marathon and then won the Los Angeles Marathon in May. She did not run in 2010 but returned in good form with a third-place finish at the 2011 Tokyo Marathon in February and a fifth-place finish (2:25:01) in Berlin in September.

Arkhipova competed in the 2012 Olympic Marathon in London under her married name. She ran the first half conservatively and caught up to the leaders at about 30 kilometers. She stayed with them until the final kilometer, when she fell back into bronze medal position and ended up finishing third in a personal best of 2:23:29.

International competitions

Personal bests
3000 metres – 8:44.13 min (2006)
3000 metres steeplechase – 9:09.19 min (2007)
5000 metres – 15:46.58 min (2003)
10,000 metres – 32:17.49 min (2005)
Marathon – 2:23:29 hrs (2012)

See also
List of Olympic medalists in athletics (women)
List of 2012 Summer Olympics medal winners
List of World Athletics Championships medalists (women)
Steeplechase at the Olympics
Marathons at the Olympics
Steeplechase at the World Championships in Athletics

References

External links 

Marathon Info profile

1983 births
Living people
People from Urmarsky District
Sportspeople from Chuvashia
Russian female long-distance runners
Russian female marathon runners
Russian female steeplechase runners
Russian female cross country runners
Olympic female marathon runners
Olympic female steeplechase runners
Olympic athletes of Russia
Olympic bronze medalists for Russia
Olympic bronze medalists in athletics (track and field)
Athletes (track and field) at the 2008 Summer Olympics
Athletes (track and field) at the 2012 Summer Olympics
Medalists at the 2012 Summer Olympics
World Athletics Championships athletes for Russia
World Athletics Championships medalists
European Athletics Championships medalists
Russian Athletics Championships winners
20th-century Russian women
21st-century Russian women